Phospholipid scramblase 4, also known as Ca2+-dependent phospholipid scramblase 4, is a protein that is encoded in humans by the PLSCR4 gene.

See also 
 Scramblase

References

Further reading